2014–15 Albanian Cup was the sixty-three season of Albania's annual cup competition. Flamurtari were the most recent winners of the competition, that being their fourth first Cup trophy.

Ties are played in a two-legged format similar to those of European competitions. If the aggregate score is tied after both games, the team with the higher number of away goals advances. If the number of away goals is equal in both games, the match is decided by extra time and a penalty shoot-out, if necessary.

Preliminary round
In order to reduce the number of participating teams for the first round to 32, a preliminary tournament is played. In contrast to the main tournament, the preliminary tournament is held as a single-leg knock-out competition. Matches were played on 29 August 2014 and involved the teams from Kategoria e Parë and Kategoria e Dytë.

|-

|}

First round
All 28 teams of the 2014–15 Superiore and Kategoria e Parë entered in this round along with the two qualifiers from the preliminary round. The first legs were played on 1 October 2014 and the second legs took place on 22 October 2014.

|}

Kukësi advanced to the second round.

Veleçiku advanced to the second round.

Lushnja advanced to the second round.

Elbasani advanced to the second round.

Flamurtari advanced to the second round.

Partizani advanced to the second round.

Skënderbeu advanced to the second round.

Laçi advanced to the second round.

Apolonia advanced to the second round.

Kastrioti advanced to the second round.

Vllaznia advanced to the second round.

Teuta advanced to the second round.

Tirana advanced to the second round.

Pogradeci advanced to the second round.

Tërbuni advanced to the second round.

Bylis advanced to the second round.

Second round
All 16 qualified teams from First round progressed to the second round. The first legs were played on 5 November 2014 and the second legs took place on 19 November 2014.

|}

Flamurtari advanced to the quarter finals.

Skënderbeu advanced to the quarter finals.

Laçi advanced to the quarter finals.

Partizani advanced to the quarter finals.

Tirana advanced to the quarter finals.

Vllaznia advanced to the quarter finals.

Kukësi advanced to the quarter finals.

Apolonia advanced to the quarter finals.

Quarter-finals
All eight qualified teams from the second round progressed to the third round. The first legs were played on 4 February 2015 and the second legs took place on 18 February 2015.

|}

Skënderbeu advanced to the semi finals.

Laçi advanced to the semi finals.

Kukësi advanced to the semi finals.

Tirana advanced to the semi finals.

Semi-finals

|}

Kukësi advanced to the final.

Laçi advanced to the final.

Final

References

External links
 Official website 
 Albanian Cup at soccerway.com

Cup
Albanian Cup seasons
Albanian Cup